Niantic, Inc. is an American software development company based in San Francisco. Niantic is best known for developing the augmented reality mobile games Ingress and Pokémon Go. The company was formed as Niantic Labs in 2010 as an internal startup within Google. The company became an independent entity in October 2015 when Google restructured under Alphabet Inc. Niantic has additional offices in Bellevue and Los Angeles.

History

Founding 

The company was formed in 2010 by John Hanke as Niantic Labs, an internal startup within Google. The company took its name from the whaling vessel Niantic, which came to San Francisco during the California Gold Rush in the 1800s.  At the time Ingress was launched, Niantic had 35 employees.

As an independent, private company 
The company spun out of Google in October 2015 soon after Google's announcement of its restructuring as Alphabet Inc. During the spinout, Niantic announced that Google, Nintendo, and The Pokémon Company would invest up to $30 million in Series-A funding, $20 million upfront and the remaining $10 million in financing conditioned upon the company achieving certain milestones, to support the growth of the company and its products. In February 2016, Niantic announced that it had secured an additional $5 million in Series A funding including investment from venture capital firms Alsop Louie Partners and You & Mr. Jones Brandtech Ventures, as well as angel investors Lucas Nealan, Cyan Banister, and Scott Banister. While adding more support for the growth of the company, this investment enabled Niantic to bring in strategic industry pioneers including the addition of Gilman Louie to its board.

In November 2017, Niantic raised $200 million in Series B funding from multiple investors, led by Spark Capital. Spark's Megan Quinn joined Niantic's board of directors during this investment round.

In January 2019, it was reported that Niantic had raised an additional $245 million in a Series C fundraising round. The round was led by Institutional Venture Partners (IVP), but also included investments from strategic partners such as AXiomatic Gaming and Samsung Ventures. The investment valued the company at $3.7 billion, excluding the investment itself.

Acquisitions and investments

In November 2017, it was announced that Niantic had acquired Evertoon, an app which allows users to make short, personalized films. According to the company's announcement, the acquisition is meant to help build social systems. At the time of the acquisition, Evertoon was only 18 months old and had only 5 employees.

In February 2018, Niantic announced that it had acquired augmented reality company Escher Reality, a team focused on building persistent, cross-platform, multi-user experiences. Hanke stated that Niantic planned to allow third-party developers to build AR games similar to Pokémon Go.

In June 2018, Niantic announced the acquisition of computer vision and machine learning company Matrix Mill. The Matrix Mill team has spent years focusing on perfecting augmented reality occlusion by building deep neural networks that can infer 3D information about the surrounding world. The acquisition significantly advances Niantic's efforts to deliver planet-scale AR and provide even more realistic AR experiences.

In July 2018, Niantic announced the acquisition of LA-based gaming studio, Seismic Games. The gaming studio consists of industry veterans from EA/Pandemic and Activision, and best known for co-developing Marvel Strike Force.

In November 2018, Niantic invested in DigiLens alongside Mitsubishi Chemical's Diamond Edge Ventures. The investment will help DigiLens develop holographic waveguide displays for augmented reality applications.

In June 2019, Niantic announced the acquisition of London-based development studio, Sensible Object. Niantic CEO Hanke states on behalf of the company that the acquisition "significantly advances [Niantic's] efforts in developing a wide range of gaming experiences that bring the physical and digital world closer together". In March 2020, Niantic acquired 3D world-scanning software company 6D.ai. In January 2021, Niantic acquired community gaming platform Mayhem.

In 2021, Niantic acquired Scaniverse, a 3D scanning app, and Lowkey, a social gaming platform in which users can record and share gameplay moments. In 2022, Niantic announced the acquisition of 8th Wall, a WebAR development platform, and NZXR, an augmented reality studio.

Lightship
In June 2018, Niantic shared a sneak peek behind the technology they had been developing for years: the Niantic Real World Platform. The core platform consists of a suite of tools including: AR Cloud, anti-cheat security, POI data, IAP, social, analytics, CRM, sponsorship, and more. Niantic mentioned that they intend to open up the platform in the future for use by third-party developers.

In December 2018, Niantic announced their Beyond Reality Developer Contest offering third-party developers an opportunity to develop a new game experience on the Niantic Real World Platform for a chance to compete for a prize pool of more than $1 million.

In early 2021, Niantic rebranded the Niantic Real World Platform as Lightship. In November 2021, Niantic launched the Lightship software development kit for augmented reality based on Unity. The company raised $300 million from Coatue Management for further development of Lightship and Niantic's "real-world metaverse", valuing the company at $9 billion.

Products

Field Trip 

In 2012, Niantic's launched its first product, Field Trip, a location-based mobile app which acted as "your guide to the cool, hidden, and unique things in the world around you."

In July 2019, Niantic announced they would shut down the app later that year, with the app itself being removed from app stores immediately.

Ingress and Ingress Prime 

Niantic's first augmented reality game Ingress was initially made available on Android by invitation only in November 2012. It was then released publicly in October 2013. An iOS version was released in July 2014.

Initially, Niantic had taken an alternative approach to monetization, veering away from more traditional mobile application development standards such as ad placements and in-app purchases. However, following the split with Google in 2015, in-app purchasing was implemented for Ingress. John Hanke has noted that Ingress is a "proof of concept", adding that a next step could involve packaging application programming interfaces (APIs) from the Ingress application in order to entice developers. Companies that partnered with Niantic were marketed through the narrative of Ingress rather than direct marketing techniques.

In November 2018, Niantic released a revamped version of the game branded as Ingress Prime. Prime is completely rewritten within Unity and the company used critical learnings gained from Pokémon Go and Ingress for its development. Niantic also retained the older Ingress game as a separate download named Scanner [REDACTED]. The intention of the older Ingress game was to help aid players with the transition to Prime as feature parity was reached between both games in 2019.

In collaboration with Craftar Studio, Ingress: The Animation, a television series based on the popular augmented reality game was produced. It began airing in Japan on Fuji TV's +Ultra programming block in October 2018. On April 30, 2019, the series premiered globally on Netflix.

Endgame: Proving Ground 
Niantic's second announced mobile game, Endgame: Proving Ground, was a part of the transmedia storytelling project that also included an alternate reality game, Endgame: Ancient Truth and novels by James Frey starting with Endgame: The Calling. Nothing has been heard of it since, making the game vaporware.

Pokémon Go 

In September 2015, it was announced that Niantic had been developing Pokémon Go in partnership with Nintendo and The Pokémon Company for iOS and Android devices. Tatsuo Nomura, who joined Niantic in 2015 after he developed the Google Maps: Pokémon Challenge, acted as Director and Product Manager for the game.

The game was initially released in Australia, New Zealand, and the United States in July 2016 (and released to much of the rest of the world throughout the remainder of 2016), where it became an overnight global phenomenon, significantly increasing the use and visibility of augmented reality technology. In addition to topping app store charts in most regions, Apple Inc. announced that Pokémon Go had become the most downloaded app in a first week ever, which was topped by Super Mario Run later that year. Reports indicated that users were spending more time on Pokémon Go than on Facebook, Twitter, Snapchat, Tinder, and Instagram. In one month, Pokémon Go was downloaded more than 100 million times, with daily revenues exceeding $10 million. Exactly two months after its launch, at Apple's September keynote, John Hanke announced that Pokémon Go exceeded 500 million downloads worldwide and that players around the world had walked over 4.6 billion kilometers. By December, it was announced that the kilometer distance achieved in September had nearly doubled to over 8.7 billion kilometers, meaning that players had collectively walked further than the distance to Pluto. By the end of February 2017, Pokémon Go had surpassed over 650 million downloads. During Pokémon Gos Adventure Week in-game promo in May 2017, Niantic announced that players had collectively walked over 15.8 billion kilometers, roughly the distance from Earth past the edge of the solar system. On June 8, 2017, it was revealed that Pokémon Go had been downloaded over 750 million times globally. In 2019, it was revealed that Pokémon Go had been downloaded over 1 billion times.

Like Ingress, Pokémon Go has a similar approach to monetization. The game has two main revenue streams, in-app purchases and regional partnerships. To date, Pokémon Go has established several partnerships around the globe among which include Verizon and Starbucks in the United States, Reliance Jio in India, SoftBank and 7-Eleven in Japan.

Harry Potter: Wizards Unite

In November 2017, it was announced that Niantic had been developing Harry Potter: Wizards Unite in partnership with Warner Bros. Interactive Entertainment and WB Games San Francisco, under the Portkey Games banner. The mobile AR game, inspired by J.K. Rowling's Wizarding World and Harry Potter, is said to allow players to "explore real-world neighborhoods and cities to discover mysterious artifacts, learn to cast spells, and encounter legendary beasts and iconic characters along the way". The game was released in New Zealand as an open beta on April 16, 2019. Beta testing in Australia began on May 1, 2019. The game was released worldwide on June 22, 2019. The game shut down on January 31, 2022.

Catan: World Explorers 

After a few months of silence regarding the possible deal, Niantic confirmed to The Verge that they had been involved with the game's creation. In November 2019, CATAN GmbH announced at the 2019 Spiel that it was working on a “upcoming massively multiplayer location based game” titled Catan: World Explorers. The game was to be based on the Catan board games; players moved through the real world, using their smartphones to build a Catan universe.

The game was soft-launched as an open beta for New Zealand, Australia, Denmark, Switzerland, and Singapore. The game shut down in November 2021.

Transformers: Heavy Metal 
In June 2021, it was announced that Niantic had been developing Transformers: Heavy Metal in partnership with Hasbro and Tomy. The game was being co-developed with Seattle-based studio Very Very Spaceship, but Niantic ultimately cancelled the game and three others in June 2022 amidst layoffs.

Pikmin Bloom 

On October 26, 2021, Nintendo and Niantic announced launching a brand new smartphone app for the franchise Pikmin. The project is an AR-based adventure in the real world that has the meaning of making walking fun with the little creatures named Pikmin. This app is the first one to be developed by Niantic's Tokyo division established in 2018. The app was released worldwide on November 2, 2021, following a series of soft launches the previous week.

Peridot 
On April 14, 2022, Niantic announced launching a new smartphone AR game Peridot, set to be launched later in 2022. Peridot open beta was initially released in Norway on July 28, 2022. The app will be released worldwide on May 9, 2023.

NBA All-World 
On June 28, 2022, Niantic announced it had a partnership with the National Basketball Association (NBA) and National Basketball Players Association (NBPA) for an AR game titled NBA All-World. The game was released worldwide on January 24, 2023.

Campfire 
Around mid-2022, Niantic began rolling out its "Campfire" app, intended to function as a companion app to its games in lieu of social features within the games themselves. The app is intended to allow players to find community groups, which had previously been based on third-party platforms such as Reddit and Discord.

Controversies

Lawsuits
Niantic has been sued in at least two class-action lawsuits: one starting in 2016 due to complaints from homeowners regarding trespassing and nuisance caused by Pokémon Go players, and a $1.58 million settlement following gameplay issues during a real-life event in Chicago.

Spoofing and hacking
On June 15, 2019, Niantic sued Global++, an unauthorized third-party software created by an "association of hackers" which allowed players to spoof their GPS location for the purpose of cheating in Niantic's augmented reality games, including Ingress and Pokémon Go. Niantic claimed that the hacked versions of the applications were infringing on their intellectual property rights. The developer of Global++ earned money by selling subscriptions and asking for donations via the hacked apps. This resulted in Niantic forcing the developers to terminate their illegitimate distributions of the hacked apps and reverse engineering the games' codes. Eventually Global++ had to shut down their services, PokeGo++ and Ingress++, and their social media services. Niantic has also claimed that Global++ was also in the process of creating Potter++—shortly before the release of the actual content—which Niantic stated would harm the success of the game. The lawsuit was settled for $5 million following a decision on January 12, 2021, and Niantic was granted a permanent injunction.

In-game COVID-19 pandemic bonus rollbacks
New Zealand and the United States were the first to have their pandemic bonuses reverted on August 1. Despite increasing rates of the SARS-CoV-2 Delta variant in the U.S., Niantic kept the bonuses disabled. Players began boycotting Pokémon Go in the first week of August 2021. Niantic responded to the community on August 26 by permanently changing the interaction distance to 80 meters.

References

External links 
 

American companies established in 2010
2010 establishments in California
Augmented reality
Companies based in San Francisco
Mobile game companies
Privately held companies based in California
Software companies based in the San Francisco Bay Area
Video game companies established in 2010
Video game companies based in California
Video game development companies
Pervasive games
Virtual reality companies